Triss is a fantasy novel by Brian Jacques, published in 2002. It is the 15th book in the Redwall series.

Plot summary
At Riftgard, an isle in the far north, the ferret king, King Agarnu, and his cruel offspring, Princess Kurda and Prince Bladd hold sway over a Ratguard army and enslaved creatures. One of the slaves, Trisscar Swordmaid escapes with her friends Shogg and Welfo, southward to Mossflower. In the attempt, her friend Drufo is killed. Meanwhile, Kurda hires a pirate ship, the Seascab, captained by Plugg Firetail, to take her to Mossflower, where she must find the royal artefacts of Riftgard to seal her queenship.

In Redwall Abbey, rebellious Dibbuns Ruggum and Bikkle run away into Mossflower Woods. They discover Brockhall, the ancestral home of badgers, but are chased away by serpents. Fortunately, they are rescued by the Skipper of Otters and Log-a-Log Groo, and they bring with them a golden paw-ring with strange markings.

Sagaxus, heir to Salamandastron, and his friend Bescarum Lepuswold Whippscut (who go by Sagax and Scarum respectively), leave the mountain for adventure with Kroova Wavedog, in his ketch the Stopdog. Scarum's father, Colonel Whippscut of the Long Patrol, searches for them in the name of Lord Hightor, the Badger Lord. Sagax finds a bow on the ketch (the property of its previous owners) with similar markings to the pawring. They disregard it and decide to journey to Redwall, and on their way, they wind up in possession of a dagger with the same pattern.

Triss and her friends, in their ship, see the same markings. Triss is able to interpret them as an R, H, O, and R, standing for "Royal House of Riftgard". On the journey, they become dehydrated, but are rescued by the hedgehogs of Peace Island. Welfo remains with her newfound love, Urtica, while Triss and Shogg continue south. They cross paths with Kurda on the Seascab in the middle of a lightning storm, but the contraband vessel escapes.

Meanwhile, the Redwall denizens try to explore Brockhall, but it is inhabited by three serpents, one of which wears a crown with the Riftgard pattern. The adders, Zassaliss, Harssacss, and Sesstra, are the children of Berussca, an adder slain by and who in turn slew King Sarengo, Agarnu's father; they remain bound by Sarengo's mace and chain. Ovus, a tawny owl, brings Bluddbeak, an ancient red kite from afar to defeat the adders, but in their attempt, both birds die. Mokug, a golden hamster who had been Sarengo's slave, is rescued and brings with him a message in Riftgard script. Martin the Warrior visits Skipper's niece, Churk, in her dreams, giving the Redwallers the hint they need to decode the message, but it is a riddle that's difficult to interpret.

Elsewhere, Sagax, Scarum, and Kroova are captured by the crew of the Seascab, and the Stopdog is destroyed. Triss and Shogg meet up with them, and together they are able to escape. Kroova and Shogg set up a hidden stake that injures Plugg, and his tail falls off, though he reattaches it with pine resin.

Kurda and her vermin then cross paths with the Redwallers, who fend them off, while Triss, Shogg, Sagax, Scarum, and Kroova enter the safety of the abbey. Triss sees the Sword of Martin and is immediately drawn to it, wielding it as the Redwallers continue to battle the Ratguard army. Bladd is killed by a falling pot of oatmeal, and Plugg is killed by the snakes, while Kurda concentrates her efforts on destroying the denizens of Redwall.

Eventually, Skipper's niece helps solve the riddle, which leads the Redwallers to Brockhall. There they encounter both the Ratguards and the snakes. During the ensuing battle, Shogg, Sagax, and Triss kill Sesstra, Harssacss, and Zassaliss, but Shogg is poisoned and dies by Triss's side. Later, Triss and Kurda face off, but Kurda falls on her own sword and dies.

Triss, Kroova, Sagax, Scarum, Groo, Skipper, Mokug, and others sail to Riftgard and free the slaves. There, King Agarnu is drowned by the slaves. Kroova stays on Riftgard with the sea otter Sleeve, and the others return to Redwall Abbey.

This article is licensed under the Creative Commons Attribution-ShareAlike 3.0 License. It uses material from the Redwall Wiki article Triss.

Characters in Triss

The Pure Ferrets:
Sarengo
Agarnu
Kurda
Bladd
Trisscar Swordmaid
Shogg
Welfo
Urtica
Plugg Firetail
Skipper of Otters
Log-a-Log Groo
Sagaxus (Sagax)
Bescarum Lepuswold Whippscut (Scarum)
Kroova Wavedog
Lord Hightor
The Adders:
Berussca
Zassaliss
Harssacss
Sesstra
Ovus and Bluddbeak
Mokug the Hamster

Translations
(French) Rougemuraille : L'Odyssée de Triss
(Russian) "Трисс Воительница"

Book divisions (English)
 Book 1: A Season of Runaways
 Book 2: Serpents and Paradoxes
 Book 3: The Swordmaid

References

External links

 Plot summary

Fictional squirrels
2002 British novels
Children's fantasy novels
British children's novels
British fantasy novels
Redwall books
2002 children's books
2002 fantasy novels